Ivo Murray Twisleton-Wykeham-Fiennes, 20th Baron Saye and Sele OBE MC (15 December 1885 - 21 October 1968) was a British peer and army officer.

Biography 
He was born to Geoffrey Twisleton-Wykeham-Fiennes, 18th Baron Saye and Sele. He educated at Harrow and the Royal Military Academy, Woolwich.

He served as an officer during the First World War and was mentioned in despatches. He gained the rank of Lieutenant-Colonel in the Royal Artillery. For his service he was awarded the Croix de Guerre (1919) and the Military Cross (M.C.) (1918). He also fought in the Second World War between 1939 and 1941.

He succeeded as the 14th Lord Saye and Sele [E., 1603], 20th Baron Saye and Sele on 18 February 1949 and appointed Officer, Order of the British Empire (O.B.E.) in 1961.

References

Notes 
Dod's Parliamentary Companion 1958, pp 213 & 214. See also other annual editions.
 Ivo Murray Twisleton-Wykeham-Fiennes, 20th Baron Saye and Sele's entry in Who's Who: https://doi.org/10.1093/ww/9780199540884.013.U54256

1885 births
1968 deaths
Fiennes family
People educated at Harrow School
British Army officers
Royal Artillery officers
Recipients of the Croix de Guerre 1914–1918 (France)
Recipients of the Military Cross
British Army personnel of World War I
British Army personnel of World War II